Hornsby is a surname. Notable people with the surname include:

 Aubrey Hornsby (1895–1981), American U.S. Army officer and aviation pioneer
 Brian Hornsby (born 1954), English footballer
 Bruce Hornsby (born 1954), American pianist and musician
 Dan Hornsby (1900–1951), American bluegrass musician
 Ernest C. Hornsby (born 1936), Chief Justice of the Supreme Court of Alabama
 J. William Hornsby (1927–2007), mayor of Newport News, Virginia
 Jennifer Hornsby (born 1951), British philosopher
 John Hornsby (born 1956), American composer and musician; brother of Bruce
 Keith Hornsby (born 1991), American basketball player; son of Bruce
Nick Hornsby (born  1995), American basketball player for Hapoel Be'er Sheva in the Israeli Basketball Premier League
 Nikki Hornsby, American singer-songwriter, musician
 Rogers Hornsby (1896–1963), American major league baseball player
 Thomas Hornsby (1733–1810), British astronomer and mathematician

Fictional
 Lance Hornsby, A character in The Walking Dead.

See also
 Hornby (surname)

English-language surnames